Robby Schlund (born 19 February 1967) is a German politician for the populist Alternative for Germany (AfD) party and from 2017 to 2021 member of the Bundestag, the federal legislative body.

Biography

Schlund was born 1967 in the East German town of Gera and was a professional soldier in the state socialist National People's Army of the GDR.

Schlund entered the newly founded populist AfD and delineates himself as a member of the right-wing factional cluster 'Der Flügel' (the wing) around Björn Höcke.

After the 2017 German federal election he became a member of the Bundestag.

References

Living people
1967 births
People from Gera
Members of the Bundestag 2017–2021
Members of the Bundestag for the Alternative for Germany
Politicians affected by a party expulsion process